Brian "Chicka" Moore (19 April 1944 – 26 October 2014) was an Australian rugby league footballer and coach.

Playing career
Moore played in the New South Wales Rugby Football League premiership for Newtown from 1962 to 1973 - scoring 90 tries during his long and successful career.  He represented New South Wales in 1963, 1965 and 1970. He also represented Australia, touring Great Britain and France with the 1967/68 Kangaroos, playing 11 minor tour matches but no tests.

During the 1970s Moore captain-coached in the Newcastle Rugby League with the Macquarie United club. While playing football, Moore also served in the New South Wales Police Force and in 2008, rugby league's centenary year in Australia, he was named at centre in a NSW Police team of the century.

Coaching career
Moore later coached the club for its final season, the 1983 Winfield Cup Premiership.

Post playing
In 2008, Brian 'Chicka' Moore was named in the Newtown team of the century. He died following a long illness on 26 October 2014.

References

Brian Moore at yesterdayshero.com.au

1944 births
2014 deaths
Australia national rugby league team players
Australian police officers
Australian rugby league coaches
Australian rugby league players
Macquarie Scorpions players
New South Wales rugby league team players
Newtown Jets coaches
Newtown Jets players
Rugby league centres